Omid Nooshin (02 May 1974 - 15 January 2018) was an English film director and writer. He was best known for his debut independent feature film Last Passenger.

Early life
Nooshin was born in Guildford, Surrey, in 1974, the son of Hoshyar Nooshin, Emeritus Professor of Space Structures at Surrey University. He cites Star Wars as his inspiration to begin making short films at the age of 11, and wrote his first feature film outline whilst studying for his maths A-level at Christ’s College School, Guildford. He went on to study film at the University for the Creative Arts, Farnham.

Early career
Upon graduation, Nooshin began making short films and commercials. During this time he took every opportunity to get close to film production, gatecrashing the sets of Stanley Kubrick’s Eyes Wide Shut and George Lucas’ Star Wars: Episode I – The Phantom Menace. In the late 1990s, Nooshin travelled to New York and spent much of his time at famed method acting institute The Actor’s Studio, watching others including Arthur Penn take drama classes. In 1999, his short film Panic, based on a true story of a carjacking gone awry, played at several international film festivals and opened doors with industry executives in London and Los Angeles. Soon after, Nooshin began writing feature scripts and signed with talent agency CAA.

Breakthrough
In 2008 Nooshin's script for Last Passenger was voted onto the Brit List of favourite unproduced British screenplays. It later was made into a film starring Dougray Scott, for which Nooshin received a nomination for the Douglas Hickox Award For Best Debut Director at The British Independent Film Awards.

In a 2013 interview for his former college Nooshin expressed his view that "The film industry is built on a cultural fault line where the tectonic plates of art and commerce meet. As a filmmaker you should anticipate and be prepared to tough out frequent tremors and the occasional earthquake."

Death
Nooshin died suddenly on 15 January 2018 at the age of 43.

Filmography

Feature films
 Last Passenger (2013) (writer, director)
 Redivider (2016) (writer)

Short films
 Panic (1999) (writer, director, composer, actor, producer)
 Rooftop (1996) (writer, director, composer, producer)

Awards

References

External links
 

1974 births
2018 deaths
People from Guildford
British film directors